Megachile florensis is a species of bee in the family Megachilidae. It was described by Mitchell in 1943.

References

Florensis
Insects described in 1943